Volodarskyi Raion may refer to:
Volodarka Raion, a raion in Kyiv Oblast, Ukraine
Volodarske Raion, a raion in Donetsk Oblast, Ukraine

See also
Volodarsky District